Mount Morris Township is located in Ogle County, Illinois. As of the 2010 census, its population was 3,968 and it contained 1,858 housing units.

Geography

Demographics

References

External links
 US Census
 City-data.com
 Ogle County Official Site

Townships in Ogle County, Illinois
Townships in Illinois